Deepak Bhatt (born 5 December 1988) is an Indian dhol player, musical producer, and composer.
He has been in the Indian music industry for over a decade, having started at a very young age. Deepak, in his professional career, has played with various national as well as international artists so far, and his talent and dedication towards his instrument has brought him a place amongst the Masters of percussion.

Early life and education

Deepak Bhatt was born (Father: Jagdish Bhatt, Mother: Benarasi Bhatt) in Antop Hill, Mumbai to a financially humble family, where his father and brothers would play dhol during festivals and at marriages. He showed talent in the field at an early age, accompanying his father and brother to play. They even played on the local trains of Mumbai. Deepak studied until standard 8th in a government school before he began to pursue music as his career. 
Deepak received formal training to play the dhol, an Indian two sided percussion instrument, under his guru, Taufiq Qureshi back in 2003.

Career

Bhatt gravitated towards the Dhol at a very early stage in his life and ever since, his dedication towards his instrument has brought him a place amongst the Masters of percussion.

The notable highlights of Deepak's career are: 
His participation in The Grammy award winning World Music Album 2009 Global Drum Project by Giovanni Hidalgo, Mickey Hart, Sikiru Adepoju, and Zakir Hussain.

Intercontinental Masters of Percussion tour (USA, UK, India), where Bhatt shared the stage with Zakir Hussain and the other Masters of Percussion

Part of the 2009 Indian Circus A R Rahman band in Germany for Primetime Entertainment.

The three continent Masters of Percussion US, UK and India Tour in 2014 has been the highlight of his career sharing the stage with Ustad Zakir Hussain, Steve Smith, Niladri Kumar, Selva Ganesh, Dilshad Khan, Vijay Chavan, Rakesh Chaurasia, Sabir Khan, Abbos Kosimov.

Films and television series  

Apart from stage shows and tours, Deepak Bhatt has also played for music scores in the Indian Film and Indian Television Industry.

 Dhoom 2
 Bhool Bhulaiya
 Welcome
 Jab We Met
 Chandni Chowk to China
 Kites (film)
 Life in a Metro
 Sawariya
 London Dreams
 Partner
 Chillar Party
 2 States: The Story of My Marriage
 Sa Re Ga Ma Pa
 Idea Jalsa
 Waar Parriwar
 Junoon (TV series)

References

External links
 

1988 births
Living people
Musicians from Mumbai
Dhol players
Instrumental gharanas
Hindustani instrumentalists
World music musicians
Indian male classical musicians
Indian film score composers
Hindustani composers
21st-century drummers
Indian male film score composers
21st-century male musicians